Syeda Ghulam Fatima is a Pakistani human and labour rights activist, known for her work in ending bonded labour in brick kilns, and is General Secretary of Lahore-based Bonded Labour Liberation Front Pakistan (BLLF).

Biography
Fatima holds a master's degree in Political Science from Punjab University. She has been campaigning for worker's rights and against bonded labour in Pakistani brick factories, kilns. She has been threatened, attacked, and wounded because of her activism.  Through her organization, the Bonded Labour Liberation Front, Fatima has established Freedom Centers where workers can go for protection and legal counsel.  She is the elected General Secretary of Bonded Labour Liberation Front Pakistan.
Alongside her husband, Fatima runs BLLF from a storefront in Lahore.

She helped to release more than 80,000 bonded laborers in Pakistan from all provinces since her engagement, and  trained more than 600 women in alternative skills for poverty reduction. In September 2015, Fatima was awarded a Clinton Global Citizen Award for "leadership in civil society" in New York.

In March 2016 Fatima was one of four finalists nominated for the Aurora Prize for Awakening Humanity, an award given to humanitarians in memory of the Armenian genocide

Media coverage

In August 2015, Fatima and the Bonded Labour Liberation Front received international attention when they were featured in a 7-part series by the popular internet photojournalism Facebook page, Humans of New York. ( photo block of New York) 7  photos were published on her life and work for the human rights especially for Bonded labours. Also shared was the official YouTube video featuring the 2014 EMI award-winning Vice documentary episode about her work, aired on HBO, that links to the 'Episode 2 Extended: Forced Slavery Interview' by the award-winning journalist Fazeelat Aslam. As the result of an appeal by the Facebook page, over $2,300,000 USD was raised in several days for the Bonded Labour Liberation Front.

https://commons.m.wikimedia.org/wiki/File:Bonded_labour_activist_Syeda_Ghulam_Fatima_courtesy(_Humans_of_New_York).jpg

Struggles

Since 38 years of her life she has been serving for bonded labours liberation rights started from general talk with women bonded labours. She most often visit with her friends and teacher They had been tortured here her teacher had been beaten cruelly by bonded honors after which her friends got scared and stop coming with her but not her there's nothing to stop her as she is a determined women. She started from struggle against slavery through education for labour's awareness provided them with 6 toilets for women and 4 for males water taps as there was no facilities for the labours she do many programs, rallies on international labour day and seminar for women labours where almost 300 women were provided with alternative skills also appeal to supreme court after which in 1992  law were introduced against forced labour , 1995 rules on forced labour had been made.

See also

 The State of Bonded Labor in Pakistan
 Debt bondage in India
 Slavery in Pakistan
 Child labour in Pakistan
 Human rights in Pakistan
 Feudalism in Pakistan
 Brick Kiln Slavery - Pakistan 
Struggles of Syeda Ghulam Fatima

References 

Debt bondage in South Asia
Labour relations in Pakistan
Living people
Pakistani human rights activists
People from Lahore
University of the Punjab alumni
Workers' rights activists
Punjabi people
Year of birth missing (living people)